Nightingale is a discontinued free, open source audio player based on the Songbird media player source code. As such, Nightingale's engine is based on the Mozilla XULRunner with libraries such as the GStreamer media framework and libtag providing media tagging and playback support, amongst others.  Since official support for Linux was dropped by Songbird in April 2010, Linux-using members of the Songbird community diverged and created the project. By contrast to Songbird, which is primarily licensed under the GPLv2 but includes artwork that is not freely distributable, Nightingale is free software, licensed under the GPLv2, with portions under the MPL and BSD licenses.

Nightingale has not seen a new release since 2014 and most, if not all, Nightingale developers are no longer actively contributing to its development.

Notable features 
 Plugins compatible with Songbird (with one modification to the addon)
 Multi-platform compatibility with Windows XP, Vista, 7, 10, Linux and Mac OS X v10.5 (x86, x86-64).
 Ability to play multiple audio formats, such as MP3, AAC, Ogg Vorbis, FLAC, Apple Lossless and WMA
 Ability to play Apple FairPlay-encoded audio on Windows and Mac platforms via hooks into QuickTime (authorization takes place in iTunes)
 Ability to play Windows Media DRM audio on Windows platforms
A skinnable interface, with skins called "feathers"
 Media files stored on pages viewed in the browser show up as playable files in Nightingale
 MP3 file download
 Ability to subscribe to MP3 blogs as playlists
 Ability to build custom mixes
 Ability to scan the user's computer for all audio files and add them to a local library
 A configurable and collapsible graphical user interface similar to iTunes, and mini-player mode
 Keyboard shortcuts and media keyboard support
 Last.fm integration via a plugin, complete with love/hate buttons
 Microsoft MTP compatible device support
 Ability to edit and save metadata tags
 Gapless playback and ReplayGain
 Watch folders
 Media import and export (from and to iTunes)
Automatic Library Files Organization

Add-ons

Extensions 
Users can add features and change functionality in Nightingale by installing extensions. Extensions are similar to the Extensions for the Firefox browser and can be easily ported. Community coded extensions are available on The Nightingale Addons Page.

Skins 
Skins are referred to as "feathers" in Nightingale, and give users and artists the ability to change the look of Nightingale via an extension which generates a default skin. Using CSS (and optionally XUL), and an image manipulation program such as Photoshop or GIMP, users are then able to make Nightingale look however they want.

References

External links 

 
 
 Frenchbirds, a French Nightingale community

2006 software
Free software projects
Free software programmed in C++
Free media players
Free web browsers
Gecko-based software
Gopher clients
IPod software
Jukebox-style media players
macOS media players
Solaris media players
Tag editors
Windows media players
Windows web browsers
Portable software
Linux media players
Software that uses GStreamer
Software that uses XUL
Discontinued web browsers